The clubhead blenny (Acanthemblemaria balanorum) or clubhead barnacle blenny, is native to the eastern Pacific Ocean, where it occurs from the Gulf of California along the coast of Mexico south to Colombia and Ecuador.

This fish lives in rocky reef habitat in tropical marine waters no deeper than 5 m. It inhabits empty barnacle shells, in particular those of Megabalanus tintinnabulum. The female lays eggs inside the shell and the male guards them. This fish feeds primarily on zooplankton.

References

Further reading
 Brock, V. E. 1940 (23 Dec.) [ref. 13593] Three new blennioid fishes from the west coast of Mexico. Stanford Ichthyological Bulletin v. 2 (no. 1): 29–35.

External links

 

Acanthemblemaria
Fish of the Gulf of California
Fish of Mexican Pacific coast
Fish described in 1940